Dufourea is a genus of sweat bees in the family Halictidae.  There are at least 160 described species in Dufourea.

See also
 List of Dufourea species

References

 Michener, Charles D. (2000). The Bees of the World, xiv + 913.
 Michener, Charles D. (2007). The Bees of the World, Second Edition, xvi + 953.

Further reading

 

Halictidae
Bee genera